Callimation corallinum is a species of beetle in the family Cerambycidae. It was described by Fiedler in 1939. It is known from Tanzania.

References

Tragocephalini
Beetles described in 1939